Chapel Hill is a rural unincorporated community in southwest Allen County, Kentucky, United States.

References

Unincorporated communities in Allen County, Kentucky
Unincorporated communities in Kentucky